The Misericordia Hospital is a hospital located in Grosseto, Tuscany, Italy.

It is home to the International School of Robotic Surgery, founded in 2004 by Pier Cristoforo Giulianotti.

History 

The hospital was founded during the 13th century by the monks of the nearby church of San Francesco, and later became a branch of Santa Maria della Scala, Siena. It was renewed and re-opened in 1787 by the Grand Duke of Tuscany, Peter Leopold.

During the 1950s, the municipality of Grosseto considered the possibility of transferring the hospital to a modern building outside the old city, as the historic structure could not satisfy the needs of the increasing population. Construction began on 17 November 1964 and the hospital opened in 1974.

References

Bibliography

External links

Hospital buildings completed in 1974
Hospitals in Tuscany
1974 establishments in Italy
Buildings and structures in Grosseto